Regional School District 15 is a school district serving Middlebury and Southbury in Connecticut, USA.

History
On December 16, 1968, Pomperaug Regional School District 15 was formed with Middlebury and Southbury schools.

Schools
Elementary schools:
Gainfield Elementary School
Long Meadow Elementary School
Middlebury Elementary School
Pomperaug Elementary School

Middle schools:
Memorial Middle School
Rochambeau Middle School

High schools:
Pomperaug High School

References

External links
Regional School District 15

School districts in Connecticut
Southbury, Connecticut
Middlebury, Connecticut
1968 establishments in Connecticut
School districts established in 1968